The 2020 Cary Challenger was a professional tennis tournament played on hard courts. It was the 6th edition of the tournament which was part of the 2020 ATP Challenger Tour. It took place in Cary, North Carolina, United States between 9 and 15 November 2020.

Singles main-draw entrants

Seeds

 1 Rankings are as of November 2, 2020.

Other entrants
The following players received wildcards into the singles main draw:
  William Blumberg
  Alexis Galarneau
  Garrett Johns

The following players received entry from the qualifying draw:
  Thomaz Bellucci
  Christian Harrison
  Kevin King
  Aleksandr Nedovyesov

Champions

Singles

 Denis Kudla def.  Prajnesh Gunneswaran 3–6, 6–3, 6–0.

Doubles

 Teymuraz Gabashvili /  Dennis Novikov def.  Luke Bambridge /  Nathaniel Lammons 7–5, 4–6, [10–8].

References

2020 ATP Challenger Tour
2020
2020 in American tennis
November 2020 sports events in the United States